Australia competed at the 2010 Summer Youth Olympics, the inaugural Youth Olympic Games, held in Singapore from 14 August to 26 August 2010.

The Australian team consisted of the maximum number of allowed athletes (100) competing in 20 sports: archery, aquatics (diving and swimming), athletics, badminton, basketball, boxing, canoe/kayak, cycling, equestrian, gymnastics, handball, hockey, modern pentathlon, rowing, sailing, shooting, table tennis, triathlon, weightlifting and wrestling.

Medalists

Mixed-NOCs medalists

Archery

Athletics

Boys
Track and Road Events

Field Events

Girls
Track and Road Events

Field Events

Badminton

Boys

Girls

Basketball

Girls

Boxing

Boys

Canoeing

Boys

Girls

Cycling

Cross Country

Time Trial

BMX

Road Race

Overall

 * Received -5 for finishing road race with all three racers

Diving

Equestrian

Gymnastics

Artistic Gymnastics

Boys

Girls

Rhythmic Gymnastics 

Individual

Team

Trampoline

Handball

Hockey

Modern pentathlon

Rowing

Sailing

One Person Dinghy

Shooting

Pistol

Rifle

Swimming

Boys

Girls

Mixed

 * Swimmers used in heats only

Table tennis

Individual

Team

Triathlon

Girls

Men's

Mixed

Weightlifting

Wrestling

Freestyle

References

External links
Competitors List: Australia – Singapore 2010 official site
 Schedule/Results – Singapore 2010 official site

2010 in Australian sport
Nations at the 2010 Summer Youth Olympics
Australia at the Youth Olympics